Nikolskoye is a rural locality (a selo) and the administrative centre of Nikolsky Selsoviet, Nurimanovsky District, Bashkortostan, Russia. The population was 627 as of 2010. There are 4 streets.

Geography 
Nikolskoye is located 9 km east of Krasnaya Gorka (the district's administrative centre) by road. Baykal is the nearest rural locality.

References 

Rural localities in Nurimanovsky District